HiSoft Systems is a software company based in the UK, creators of a range of programming tools for microcomputers in 1980s and 1990s.

Their most well-known products were the Devpac assembler IDE environments (earlier known as GenST and GenAm for the Atari ST and Amiga, respectively). The Devpac IDE was a full editor/assembler/debugger environment written entirely in 68k assembler and was a favourite tool among programmers on the Atari GEM platform.

HiSoft also sold HiSoft BASIC and Power BASIC, HiSoft C Interpreter for the Atari ST, Aztec C, Personal Pascal, and FTL Modula-2. They also produced WERCS, the WIMP Environment Resource Construction Set.

The business was created in 1980 and was based in Dunstable, Bedfordshire before relocating to the village of Greenfield in the same county.

In November 2001, HiSoft's staff were employed by Maxon Computer Limited, the UK arm of MAXON Computer GmbH. to work on Cinema 4D.

David Link, the founder and owner, ran a café in the village of Emsworth for a year until July 2007 and a restaurant/bar/guest house() in Shanklin, Isle of Wight, from 2010 until January 2015.

HiSOFT continues, with David Link at the helm, and is now actively involved in designing websites and selling the Ambur POS system.

References

External links
 HiSoft Systems
 World of Spectrum HiSoft archive

ZX Spectrum
Software companies of the United Kingdom
Amiga
Atari ST
Atari ST software
Software companies established in 1980
1980 establishments in the United Kingdom